The Maarrat al-Numan market bombing or Maarrat al-Numan market massacre was a war crime through an aerial bombardment of a marketplace and the surrounding houses in the Syrian opposition-held town of Ma'arrat al-Numan in the Idlib Governorate of Syria. It was perpetrated on 22 July 2019, from 8:00 to 8:30 a.m. local time, during the Syrian Civil War. The bombing killed 43 civilians, including three girls, and injured another 109 people. At least two four-storey residential buildings and 25 shops were destroyed. A nearby school, located some 700 meters from the market, was damaged.

Later analysis confirmed that the bombing was perpetrated by a fighter aircraft of the Russian Federation. The attack caused even more fatalities when a "double tap" strategy was used, in which a second wave of bombing hit the same target when rescue workers were on the site minutes later, killing them.

It was part of a wider Syrian military campaign against Idlib in 2019.

The United Nations Human Rights Council recorded the crime in its report published on 2 March 2020. It stated the following:

See also
Armanaz massacre
Hass refugee camp bombing
Atarib market massacre
Kamuna refugee camp massacre

References

Reports

2019 airstrikes
2019 murders in Syria
Airstrikes conducted by Russia
August 2019 crimes in Asia
Explosions in 2019
Explosions in Syria
Idlib Governorate in the Syrian civil war
Mass murder in 2019
Massacres of the Syrian civil war in 2019
Military operations of the Syrian civil war in 2019
Military operations of the Syrian civil war involving Russia
Russian war crimes in Syria